Solidaridad is one of the eleven municipalities that make up the Mexican state of Quintana Roo. Its municipal seat is the town of Playa del Carmen.

Solidaridad is home to the Maya archaeological site of Xcaret.

Geography

The municipality has some small but rich continental sites including the ecotourism park of Xcaret. Today, it borders the municipalities of Benito Juárez and Lázaro Cárdenas to the north and Tulum to the south; and is separated in most places from its neighboring municipality to the east (Cozumel) by a stretch of the Caribbean Sea known as the Cozumel Channel.

The ecotourism park of Xel-Ha and the Calica limestone quarry are not part of Solidaridad as they belong to the neighboring municipality of Cozumel. All of the limestone from Calica is exported to the US, and the quarry has its own docks and also serves visiting cruise ships.

Orography and hydrography

Like the rest of the peninsula's surface the land has a limestone base that does not allow the formation of surface water flows such as rivers and streams, the water instead form flows in underground rivers that sometimes rise to the surface in the cenotes. Lakes and cenotes are the major water bodies of the municipality.

Communities
The largest localities (cities, towns, and villages) are:

History
Solidaridad is one of the youngest municipalities in the country: it was formed on July 28, 1993, by decree of the State Congress during the administration of Mario Villanueva Madrid. At this time the municipality of Cozumel was split into two, with the mainland section constituting the new municipality of Solidaridad.

On March 13, 2008, Solidaridad was split in two when the new Municipality of Tulum was formed, as a result its land area and population were adjusted.

Demographics

The municipality has a population of 159,310 according to the results of the Population and Housing Census of 2010 conducted by the National Institute of Statistics and Geography (Instituto Nacional de Estadística y Geografía), of these, 83,468 are men and 75,842 are women. By this time, Tulum Municipality was already separated from Solidaridad.

Currently most of its population are immigrants, mainly from the southeastern states of Mexico; but also, according to the National Institute of Migration, Mexico (Instituto Nacional de Migración de México), the municipality has 12 percent of its population of foreign origin.

References

External links
 —

 01
Municipalities of Quintana Roo